1947–48 was the second season of the Western International Hockey League.

Standings
 Kimberley Dynamiters	        27-8-0	.771	187-108
 Trail Smoke Eaters		19-17-1	.528	155-153
 Spokane Spartans		24-31-1	.436	214-252
 Nelson Maple Leafs		12-26-0	.316	112-155

Note: Spokane Spartans were not eligible for the Allan Cup.

Semi final
Best of 5
 Trail 4 Nelson 0
 Trail 5 Nelson 2
 Trail 5 Nelson 1

Trail Smoke Eaters beat Nelson Maple Leafs 3 wins to none.

Final
Best of 5
 Trail 5 Kimberley 4
 Kimberley 4 Trail 1
 Trail 3 Kimberley 2
 Kimberley 4 Trail 3
 Kimberley 6 Trail 6
 Trail 5 Kimberley 3

Trail Smoke Eaters beat Kimberley Dynamiters 3 wins to 2, 1 tie.

Since this was the only senior league in the province, the Trail Smoke Eaters advanced to the 1947-48 Western Canada Allan Cup Playoffs.

References 

Western International Hockey League seasons
Wihl
Wihl